Adrian Budka (born January 26, 1980) is a Polish footballer (midfielder) and futsal player who currently plays for Widzew Łódź.

Career

He played once in Poland national football team so far—the game versus UAE on December 6, 2006. He also played in such a clubs like Śląsk Wrocław, Polar Wrocław, Górnik Łęczna, Pogoń Szczecin and Arka Gdynia and above all, he played for Widzew Łódź in which he became one of the most respected players. When he finished his career as a professional footballer, he came back to Zduńska Wola and joined futsal team Gatta Zduńska Wola.

In August 2015 he decided to help rebuild Widzew Łódź after bankruptcy and relegation to Polish 4th division and joined team conducted by Witold Obarek.

References

External links
 

1980 births
Living people
Polish footballers
Poland international footballers
Widzew Łódź players
Śląsk Wrocław players
Górnik Łęczna players
Pogoń Szczecin players
Arka Gdynia players
Ekstraklasa players
People from Zduńska Wola
Sportspeople from Łódź Voivodeship
Polish men's futsal players
Association football midfielders